Roger Harring (October 4, 1932 – August 12, 2021) was an American football player and coach. He won 340 games over 42 seasons at both the high school and college levels.

Harring graduated from Wisconsin State College–La Crosse (later renamed University of Wisconsin–La Crosse). He graduated in 1958 with a Bachelor of Science degree in physical education.

After graduating from La Crosse, Harring coached high school football at Ladysmith High School in Ladysmith, Wisconsin (1958–1962) and at Lincoln High School in Wisconsin Rapids, Wisconsin (1963–1968). He won 79 games as a high school coach.

In 1969, Harring accepted the head coaching job at his alma mater. At Wisconsin–La Crosse, he had a 261–75–7 record. He won 15 conference titles and three national championships (1985, 1992, 1995) before his retirement in 1999.

Harring was inducted into the College Football Hall of Fame in 2005. The University of Wisconsin–La Crosse later named its football stadium “Harring Stadium” in honor of Harring's legacy.  Harring Stadium is part of the facility that is officially called Veterans Memorial Sports Field Complex.

Harring died at the age of 88 on August 12, 2021.

Head coaching record

College

See also
 List of college football coaches with 200 wins

References

External links
 

1932 births
2021 deaths
Wisconsin–La Crosse Eagles football coaches
Wisconsin–La Crosse Eagles football players
High school football coaches in Wisconsin
University of Wisconsin–La Crosse faculty
College Football Hall of Fame inductees
Sportspeople from Green Bay, Wisconsin
Coaches of American football from Wisconsin
Players of American football from Wisconsin
Educators from Wisconsin